Leslee Lewis is an Indian singer and composer known for his work with Hariharan as the duo Colonial Cousins. They won the MTV Asia Viewer's Choice Award and then the U.S. Billboard Viewer's Choice Award for 'Colonial Cousins', their debut album. He conceived and created all the music for Coke Studio, MTV India debut season.

Popularly known as 'Lezz' in the industry, Leslee Lewis is one of the first Indian composers to have introduced the Indian audiences to Rock and Pop music. Leslee's creative side comes as an inherited value from his father, P L Raj, noted choreographer from the film industry.

With an aim to give the audiences a taste of varied music flavors, he has been successful in keeping his originality intact with advertisement jingles, film music and other forms of modern music.

Early life
Leslee Lewis is the son of P. L. Raj, a prolific film choreographer. He was educated at St. Mary's High School, Mt. Abu in Rajasthan.

As a child, Leslee was greatly influenced by The Beatles, Jimi Hendrix and Eric Clapton and with further working on his musical capabilities bagged the opportunity of recording with renowned music directors.

He played guitar at the Cafe Royal, Oberoi Towers, Mumbai and recorded with Kalyanji–Anandji, Laxmikant–Pyarelal, R. D. Burman and Louis Banks.

Biography

Jingles 
From 1987, he composed advertising jingles and was nominated for awards from the Indian Academy of Advertising Film Art (IAAFA). In 1989 received an award for his work. He went on to make some famous jingles such as Doodh-Doodh-Doodh (Piyo full glass), Mango Fruity fresh and juicy, Thumbs up taste the thunder, Santoor Santoor, etc.

Mainstream music 
Lewis remixed Asha Bhosle's album Rahul and I and composed songs for Janam samjha karo, O mere sona, Piya Tu- ab toh aaja. He also composed and produced the music for Paree Hu Main by Suneeta Rao, Bombay Girl by Alisha Chinai and for KK's album Pal. He composed songs such as "Bombay Girl" and "De De- Mujh Ko" for Alisha Chinai.

He also launched Indipop boy band A Band of Boys and gave music for their hit songs such as "Meri Neendh", "Gori" and "Aa Jaa Meri Jaan".

In 1998, Lewis recorded his first solo album, Haseena. He composed the score for the Hindi films Mela and Jahd and the Tamil films Modhi Vilayadu and Chikku Bukku.

Colonial Cousins

Lewis first worked with ghazal singer Hariharan in 1992, creating a jingle. They formed Colonial Cousins in 1996 and recorded an album, Colonial Cousins. They were the first Indian act to be featured on MTV Unplugged. It won the MTV Indian Viewers' Choice award and Billboard Award for the Best Asian Music Group. They released the albums The Way We Do It (1998) and Aatma (2001) and composed the soundtrack for the Tamil films Modhi Vilayadu and Chikku Bukku.

Discography

As composer
Albums
 Dhuan (Suneeta Rao Album) (1991)
 Bombay Girl (1994)
 Colonial Cousins (1996)
 Haseena (1998)
 The Way We Do It (1998)
 Pal (1999)
 Aatma (2001)
 Meri Neend (2002)
 Gori (2002)
 Elements (2002)
 Ye Bhi Woh Bhi (2002)
 Once More (2012)
Films
 Mela (2000)
 Apna Asmaan (2007)
 Modhi Vilayadu (2009)
 Chikku Bukku (2010)
 Poshter Boyz (2014-Marathi)
 Online Binline (2015 - Marathi)

As singer
 "Kannum Kannum Nokia" - Anniyan (2005 - Tamil)
 "Vellaikaari", "Sikki Mukki" - Modhi Vilayadu (2009 - Tamil)
 "Hosahore" - Darling (2010 film) (2010 - Telugu) 
 "Hey Amigo" - Kaappaan (2019 - Tamil)

Awards and achievements
 1997: MTV Asia Viewer's Choice Award for Colonial Cousins in Radio City Hall - New York
 US Billboard Viewer's Choice Award - Las Vegas
 Awarded 'Indian of the Year 2017

References

External links
Official Website
@LesleLewis on Twitter
Lesle Lewis (official fan page) on facebook

Living people
Indian male pop singers
Tamil film score composers
Indian pop composers
1960 births
Jingle composers
Indian male film score composers